Aaron Reginald Barrett (born August 14, 1969) is a former American football wide receiver in the National Football League who played for the Detroit Lions. He played college football for the UTEP Miners.

References

1969 births
Living people
American football wide receivers
Detroit Lions players
UTEP Miners football players